The Manueline, occasionally known as Portuguese late Gothic, is the sumptuous, composite Portuguese architectural style originating in the 16th century, during the Portuguese Renaissance and Age of Discoveries. Manueline architecture incorporates maritime elements and representations of the discoveries brought from the voyages of Vasco da Gama and Pedro Álvares Cabral. This innovative style synthesizes aspects of Late Gothic Flamboyant architecture with original motifs and influences of the Plateresque, Mudéjar,  Italian, and Flemish architecture. It marks the transition from Late Gothic to Renaissance. The construction of churches and monasteries in Manueline was largely financed by proceeds of the lucrative spice trade with Africa and India.

The style was given its name, many years later, by Francisco Adolfo de Varnhagen, Viscount of Porto Seguro, in his 1842 book Noticia historica e descriptiva do Mosteiro de Belem, com um glossario de varios termos respectivos principalmente a architectura gothica, in his description of the Jerónimos Monastery. Varnhagen named the style after King Manuel I, whose reign (1495–1521) coincided with its development. The style was much influenced by the astonishing successes of the voyages of discovery of Portuguese navigators, from the coastal areas of Africa to the discovery of Brazil and the ocean routes to the Far East.

Although the period of this style did not last long (from 1490 to 1520), it played an important part in the development of Portuguese art. The influence of the style outlived the king. Celebrating the newly maritime power, it manifested itself in architecture (churches, monasteries, palaces, castles) and extended into other arts such as sculpture, painting, works of art made of precious metals, faience and furniture.

Characteristics

This decorative style is characterized by virtuoso complex ornamentation in portals, windows, columns and arcades. In its end period, it tended to become excessively exuberant as in Tomar.

Several elements appear regularly in these intricately carved stoneworks:
 elements used on ships: the armillary sphere (a navigational instrument and the personal emblem of Manuel I and also a symbol of the cosmos), spheres, anchors, anchor chains, ropes and cables.
 elements from the sea, such as shells, pearls and strings of seaweed.
 botanical motifs such as laurel branches, oak leaves, acorns, poppy capsules, corncobs, and thistles.
 symbols of Christianity such as the cross of the Order of Christ (former Knights Templar), the military order that played a prominent role and helped finance the first voyages of discovery. The cross of this order decorated the sails of the Portuguese ships.
 elements from newly discovered lands (such as the tracery in the Royal Cloister of the Batalha Monastery, suggesting Islamic filigree work, influenced by buildings in India)
 columns carved like twisted strands of rope
 semicircular arches (instead of Gothic pointed arches) of doors and windows, sometimes consisting of three or more convex curves
 multiple pillars
 eight-sided capitals
 lack of symmetry
 conical pinnacles
 bevelled crenellations
 ornate portals with niches or canopies.

Examples

When King Manuel I died in 1521, he funded 62 construction projects. However, much original Manueline architecture in Portugal was lost or damaged beyond restoration in the 1755 Lisbon earthquake and subsequent tsunami. In Lisbon, the Ribeira Palace, the residence of King Manuel I, and the Hospital Real de Todos os Santos were destroyed, along with several churches. The city, however, still has outstanding examples of the style in the Jerónimos Monastery (mainly designed by Diogo Boitac and João de Castilho) and in the small fortress of the Belém Tower (designed by Francisco de Arruda). Both are located close to each other in the Belém neighbourhood. The portal of the Church of Nossa Senhora da Conceição Velha, in downtown Lisbon, has also survived destruction.

Outside Lisbon, the church and chapter house of the Convent of Christ at Tomar (designed by Diogo de Arruda) is a major Manueline monument. In particular, the large window of the chapter house, with its fantastic sculptured organic and twisted rope forms, is one of the most extraordinary achievements of the Manueline style.

Other major Manueline monuments include the arcade screens of the Royal Cloister (designed by Diogo Boitac) and the Unfinished Chapels (designed by Mateus Fernandes) at the Monastery of Batalha and the Royal Palace of Sintra.

Other remarkable Manueline buildings include the church of the Monastery of Jesus of Setúbal (one of the earliest Manueline churches, also designed by Diogo Boitac), the Santa Cruz Monastery in Coimbra, the main churches in Golegã, Vila do Conde, Moura, Caminha, Olivença and portions of the cathedrals of Braga (main chapel), Viseu (rib vaulting of the nave) and Guarda (main portal, pillars, vaulting). Civil buildings in Manueline style exist in Évora (home to the  Évora Royal Palace of 1525, by Pedro de Trillo, Diogo de Arruda and Francisco de Arruda) and the Castle of Évoramonte of 1531), Viana do Castelo, Guimarães and some other towns.

The style was extended to the decorative arts and spread throughout the Portuguese Empire, to the islands of the Azores, Madeira, enclaves in North Africa, Brazil, Goa in Portuguese India and even Macau, China. Its influence is apparent in southern Spain, the Canary Islands, North Africa and the former Spanish colonies of Peru and Mexico.

Famous Manueline artists

Architects
 Diogo Boitac
 Mateus Fernandes
 Diogo de Arruda
 Francisco de Arruda
 João de Castilho

Painters
 Vasco Fernandes
 Jorge Afonso
 Cristóvão de Figueiredo
 Garcia Fernandes
 Gregório Lopes

Gallery

See also

Neo-Manueline
Portuguese Architecture

References

Atanázio, A Arte do Manuelino, Lisbon, Presença, 1984.
Turner, J., Grove Dictionary of Art,  Macmillan Publishers Ltd., 1996; 
The Rough Guide to Portugal,  March 2005, 11th edition, 
Smith, Robert C., The Art of Portugal 1500-1800; Weidenfeld & Nicolson, London, 1968 

 

Architectural styles
Architectural history
Maritime history of Portugal
Architecture in Portugal